Immigration to Jamaica is the responsibility of the Passport, Immigration and Citizenship Agency (PICA), an agency of the Government of Jamaica. By the late 2010s emigration continued to be greatly in excess of immigration.

History 
In March 2023, PICA employees striked over pay. As a result, there was disruption at the islands two international airports.

By country

China

England

France 

French immigration to Jamaica began in 1791.

Germany

India 

The first Indians came to Jamaica aboard the S. Blundel Hunter on 10 May 1845.

Ireland

Japan

Lebanon

Scotland

Spain

References

See also 

 Demographics of Jamaica

Jamaica
Immigration to Jamaica